Bassam Jamous is a Syrian archaeologist and general director of the Directorate-General of Antiquities and Museums (DGAM) in Damascus, Syria. He has held this position since 2005.

References

External links
 DGAM - DIRECTORATE GENERAL OF ANTIQUITIES AND  MUSEUMS  - MINISTRY OF CULTURE SYRIA, DGCS - GENERAL DIRECTION FOR DEVELOPMENT COOPERATION  - MINISTRY OF FOREIGN AFFAIRS ITALY Project Management Website

Living people
Syrian archaeologists
21st-century Syrian people
21st-century archaeologists
Year of birth missing (living people)